Laurette Spang-McCook (born May 16, 1951), credited as Laurette Spang, is an American television actress. She is best known for playing the character Cassiopeia on the original Battlestar Galactica (1978).

Early life/family 
Spang was born in Buffalo, New York, and raised in Ann Arbor, Michigan. Speech courses during her high school years sparked her interest in acting. During her youth, she was an active letter-writer, penning letters to actors. She was also a huge fan of the gothic soap opera, Dark Shadows and of the television Western, Bonanza. She is related to Bollywood producer-actor Stegath Dorr.

At age 16, she accompanied her father on a business trip to New York City, where she waited at the stage door of Dark Shadows. The stage guard allowed her to walk in, leading her to actress Kathryn Leigh Scott. After their meeting, Spang would answer Scott's fan mail through high-school.

The summer of her junior year, Spang worked with the Williamstown Summer Theater. A year later, Scott set up an audition for Spang at the American Academy of Dramatic Arts. She received a scholarship and graduated from there two years later. Following graduation in 1969, Spang returned to Michigan where she attended Adrian College, living dorm life on a small campus, but not far from her family in Ann Arbor. She dropped out of Adrian before completing her first year after her poor grades led her father to stop providing money. For two years, Spang was a typist in a real estate office, earning money to support herself and study acting.

Career
After a Universal Studios talent agent spotted her in 1972, Spang signed a 7-year contract with the studio. She then had a succession of guest-starring roles in television series including Emergency! (Episodes: Dinner Date, The Old Engine and Kidding), Adam-12 (Episode: Venice Division), The Streets of San Francisco, The Six Million Dollar Man, Happy Days, Chase, The Secrets of Isis, Charlie's Angels and Lou Grant. Spang also appeared in the television movies Short Walk to Daylight, Runaway! and Sarah T. - Portrait of a Teenage Alcoholic. She co-starred in a production of Winesburg, Ohio on KCET's Hollywood Television Theatre.

Towards the end of her contract with Universal (by which time, according to People Weekly Magazine, October 2, 1978)  her money was almost exhausted and she had been evicted from an apartment she had been renting), Spang was cast as Cassiopeia in the Battlestar Galactica pilot movie, "Saga of a Star World". An initial draft of the script had her killed off in the pilot film, in which the reptiloid Ovions consumed her, almost cannibal-style. However, the character survived and the network kept her on in a regular role in the subsequent weekly series, but "Standards and Practices" (network censors) forced a change of profession upon her. (The censors would no longer allow her to be a socialator, so Glen Larson and Donald P. Bellisario had her character become a medtech in the series, beginning with "Lost Planet of the Gods, Parts 1 & 2").

Spang's later acting performances were in The Love Boat, Fantasy Island, The Dukes of Hazzard, BJ and the Bear, Magnum, P.I., Three's Company, Man from Atlantis, The Gemini Man and more. She took a de facto retirement from acting in 1984, though she made a brief appearance in the 2007 horror film Plot 7, which also featured her by-then husband John McCook. Spang appeared in the Battlestar Galactica episode of Sciography documentary series on the Sci-Fi Channel in 2002. In 2003, she appeared in another Battlestar Galactica documentary included as an extra feature in the DVD box set of the series released for the series' 25th anniversary.

Personal life
Spang married actor John McCook on February 16, 1980; the couple have three children, including actress Molly McCook.

Filmography

References

External links
 
 
 

1951 births
Living people
American film actresses
American television actresses
Actresses from Buffalo, New York
Actresses from Michigan
Actors from Ann Arbor, Michigan
21st-century American women